The 2022 General Tire 125 was the third stock car race of the 2022 ARCA Menards Series East season, and the 22nd iteration of the event. The race was held on Friday, April 29, 2022, in Dover, Delaware at Dover Motor Speedway, a 1 mile (1.6 km) permanent oval-shaped racetrack. The race was contested over 125 laps. At race's end, Taylor Gray of David Gilliland Racing would win, after starting from the pole and leading the most laps. This was Gray's first career east series win, and his first of the season. To fill out the podium, Jesse Love and Conner Jones of Venturini Motorsports would finish 2nd and 3rd, respectively. 

The race is scheduled to be the debut of the Ford Mustang body design, which will be used by David Gilliland Racing. The manufacturer will fully replace the Ford Fusion starting in 2023.

Background 
Dover Motor Speedway (formerly Dover Downs International Speedway and later Dover International Speedway) is a race track in Dover, Delaware, United States. The track has hosted at least one NASCAR Cup Series race each year since 1969, including two per year from 1971 to 2020. In addition to NASCAR, the track also hosted USAC and the Indy Racing League. The track features one layout, a  concrete oval, with 24° banking in the turns and 9° banking on the straights. The speedway is owned and operated by Speedway Motorsports.

The track, nicknamed "The Monster Mile", was built in 1969 by Melvin Joseph of Melvin L. Joseph Construction Company, Inc., with an asphalt surface, but was replaced with concrete in 1995. Six years later in 2001, the track's capacity increased to 135,000 seats, giving the track the largest seating capacity of any sports venue in the mid-Atlantic region. In 2002, the name changed to Dover International Speedway from Dover Downs International Speedway after Dover Downs Gaming and Entertainment split, making Dover Motorsports. From 2007 to 2009, the speedway worked on an improvement project called "The Monster Makeover", which expanded facilities at the track and beautified the track. Depending on configuration, the track's capacity is at 95,500 seats. Its grand total maximum capacity was at 135,000 spectators. On November 8, 2021, it was announced that Dover Motorsports Inc. was purchased by Speedway Motorsports Inc.; effectively making Dover International Speedway a SMI track with the track being renamed to its current name.

Entry list 

 (R) denotes rookie driver.

 **Withdrew prior to the event.

Practice/Qualifying 
Practice and qualifying was both combined into one 90-minute session, with a driver's fastest time counting as their qualifying lap. It was held on Friday, April 29, at 1:15 PM EST.

Race results 
Laps: 125

References 

2022 ARCA Menards Series East
NASCAR races at Dover Motor Speedway
General Tire 125
2022 in sports in Delaware